Sewage Plant in Bubeneč is the oldest sewage treatment plant in Prague designed by William Heerlein Lindley and built between 1895–1906. In 1991, the building was declared a protected national monument and has been converted into the Eco-technical Museum.

References

Buildings and structures in Prague
Sewage treatment plants
Water supply and sanitation in the Czech Republic
National Cultural Monuments of the Czech Republic
Museums established in 1991
1991 establishments in Czechoslovakia